Cowielepis is an extinct genus of jawless fish in the class Anaspida. It is from the middle Silurian Cowie Harbour fish bed of Stonehaven, Scotland.

Habits
It was possibly a nectonic filter, of active locomotion, due to its physiognomy.

Distribution
Lochkovian of United Kingdom (Scotland).

References

External links 
 

Birkeniiformes genera
Fossil taxa described in 2008